The Soularac is a summit in the French Pyrenees, culminating at a height of  in the Tabe Massif. It has a prominence of 1007 m (3,304 ft) and its nearest highest neighbour is the Pic de Noé.

References 

Mountains of the Pyrenees
Landforms of Ariège (department)
Mountains of Occitania (administrative region)